Sharik (Russian: Шарик) means small ball in Russian. It is a common dog name in countries of the former Soviet Union and may refer to:

Sharik, a fictional dog in Bulgakov's novel Heart of a Dog
Sharik, a fictional dog in Dostoevsky's The House of the Dead
Sharik (Szarik in Polish spelling), a fictional dog in Janusz Przymanowski's Four Tank-Men and a Dog
Sharik, a fictional dog in Three from Prostokvashino
Sharik, the unofficial designation of the landing unit of Vostok and Voskhod spacecraft

See also
Sharīk Peninsula
Ba Sharik, a village in Iran
Shariq (disambiguation)